Newton County is a county located in the southwest portion of the U.S. state of Missouri. As of the 2010 census, the population was 58,114. Its county seat is Neosho. The county was organized in 1838 and is named in honor of John Newton, a hero who fought in the Revolutionary War.

Newton County is part of the Joplin, MO Metropolitan Statistical Area.

Geography

Adjacent counties
 Jasper County (north)
 Lawrence County (northeast)
 Barry County (southeast)
 McDonald County (south)
 Ottawa County, Oklahoma (west)
 Cherokee County, Kansas (northwest)

Rivers and creeks
Total river area: ; length:

Major highways

  Interstate 44
  Interstate 49
  U.S. Route 60
  U.S. Route 71
  Route 43
  Route 59
  Route 86
  Route 175

National protected area
 George Washington Carver National Monument

Demographics

As of the census of 2000, there were 52,636 people, 20,140 households, and 14,742 families residing in the county.  The population density was 84 people per square mile (33.75/km2).  There were 21,897 housing units at an average density of 35 per square mile (14/km2).  The racial makeup of the county was 93.26% White, 0.59% Black or African American, 2.23% Native American, 0.32% Asian, 0.28% Pacific Islander, 1.12% from other races, and 2.20% from two or more races.  2.18% of the population were Hispanic or Latino of any race.

There were 20,140 households, out of which 33.10% had children under the age of 18 living with them, 60.50% were married couples living together, 8.80% had a female householder with no husband present, and 26.80% were non-families. 22.70% of all households were made up of individuals, and 9.70% had someone living alone who was 65 years of age or older.  The average household size was 2.57 and the average family size was 3.00.

In the county, the population was spread out, with 26.30% under the age of 18, 8.70% from 18 to 24, 27.10% from 25 to 44, 23.80% from 45 to 64, and 14.00% who were 65 years of age or older.  The median age was 37 years. For every 100 females, there were 95.60 males.  For every 100 females age 18 and over, there were 92.30 males.

The median income for a household in the county was $35,041, and the median income for a family was $40,616. Males had a median income of $30,057 versus $21,380 for females. The per capita income for the county was $17,502.  About 8.10% of families and 11.60% of the population were below the poverty line, including 14.20% of those under age 18 and 9.50% of those age 65 or over.

2020 Census

Education

Public schools
East Newton County R-VI School District – Granby
 Granby Elementary School (K–04)
 Triway Elementary School (K–04) – Stella
 Granby Junior High School (05–08)
 Triway Junior High School (05–08)
 East Newton County High School (09–12)
 Diamond R-IV School District – Diamond
 Diamond Elementary School (PK–04)
 Diamond Middle School (05–08)
 Diamond High School (09–12)
 Neosho R-V School District – Neosho
 Field Early Childhood Center (PK)
 Benton Elementary School (K–04)
 Central Elementary School (K–04)
 George Washington Carver Elementary School (K–04)
 Goodman Elementary School (K–04)
 South Elementary School (K–04)
 Westview Elementary School (K–07)
 Neosho Middle School (05–07)
 Neosho Junior High School (08)
 Neosho High School (09–12)
  Seneca R-VII School District – Seneca
 Seneca Elementary School (PK–05)
 Iva E. Wells Middle School (06–08)
 Seneca High School (09–12)

Private schools
 Neosho (K–12) – Churches of Christ
 Neosho (PK–12) – Pentecostal Ozark Christian Academy
 Racine Apostolic Christian School – Racine (PK–12) – Pentecostal
 Trinity Learning Center [Neosho, Missouri] (K-12) [Protestant]

Post-secondary
 Crowder College – Neosho. A two-year junior college.

Public libraries
 Neosho/Newton County Library

Politics

Local
The Republican Party completely controls politics at the local level in Newton County. Republicans hold every elected position in the county.

State

Newton County is divided into four districts in the Missouri House of Representatives, all of which are held by Republicans.

District 159 — Bill Lant (R) Pineville) Consists of the communities of Fairview, Newtonia, Racine, Ritchey, Seneca, Stark City, and Stella.  

District 160 — Bill Reiboldt (R-Neosho). Consists of the communities of Diamond, Granby, Loma Linda, Neosho, Wentworth, and part of Silver Creek. 

District 161 — Bill White (R-Joplin). Consists of the communities of Leawood, Redings Mill, and parts of Joplin and Silver Creek. 

District 162 — Charlie Davis (R-Webb City). Consists of a small part of the southeastern section of Joplin.

All of Newton County is a part of Missouri's 32nd District in the Missouri Senate and is represented by Ron Richard (R-Joplin).

Federal

All of Newton County is included in Missouri's 7th Congressional District and is represented by Billy Long (R-Springfield) in the U.S. House of Representatives.

Communities

Cities

 Diamond
 Fairview
 Granby
 Joplin (mostly in Jasper County)
 Neosho (county seat)
 Seneca

Villages

 Cliff Village
 Dennis Acres
 Grand Falls Plaza
 Leawood
 Loma Linda
 Newtonia
 Redings Mill
 Ritchey
 Saginaw
 Shoal Creek Drive
 Shoal Creek Estates
 Silver Creek
 Stark City
 Stella
 Wentworth

Unincorporated communities

 Aroma
 Belfast
 Berwick
 Boulder City
 Christopher
 Gregg
 Hornet
 Jolly
 June
 McElhany
 Monark Springs
 Pepsin
 Racine
 Spring City
 Spurgeon
 Sweetwater
 Talmage City
 Tipton Ford
 Wanda

Townships

 Benton
 Berwick
 Buffalo
 Dayton
 Five Mile
 Franklin
 Granby
 Marion
 Neosho
 Newtonia
 Seneca
 Shoal Creek
 Van Buren
 West Benton

See also
 National Register of Historic Places listings in Newton County, Missouri

References

External links
 Newton County Historical Society - Official website
 Rootsweb, Newton County, Missouri
 Digitized 1930 Plat Book of Newton County  from University of Missouri Division of Special Collections, Archives, and Rare Books

 
1838 establishments in Missouri
Joplin, Missouri, metropolitan area
Populated places established in 1838